Betty Bossi is a Swiss cookbook publisher. The Betty Bossi brand published various cookbooks and newsletters and sponsored various cooking contests. Shirley Eu-Wong, author of Culture shock!: Switzerland, said that Betty Bossi "recipe booklets can be found in almost any Swiss-Romande kitchen cabinet." The brand is operated by Betty Bossi AG/Betty Bossi SA, headquartered in Zurich, which is owned by the Coop group.

History 

The name originates from "Betty Bossi", a fictional character created in the mid-1950s, taking inspiration from Betty Crocker. Gary Genosko, author of "Better than butter: Margarine and simulation," said that the character "Betty Bossi" was "a kind of Franco-Swiss Betty Crocker". Bossi was said to be the inventor of "tartines," a bread-and-butter snack.

For a period of time around 2003, Swiss International Air Lines offered a buy on board service in economy class on European flights generally 70 minutes or longer, with menu items from Betty Bossi.

In 2012 the company was purchased outright by Coop, which had previously taken a 50% stake in 2001.

After its initial investment Coop launched a range of Betty Bossi-branded convenience foods in its stores, which as of 2018 had expanded to around 1,400 lines.

See also
Swiss cuisine

References
Eu-Wong, Shirley. Culture shock!: Switzerland. Graphic Arts Center Pub. Co., 1996. , 9781558682481. Limited preview available on Google Books. Est. 1986
Genosko, Gary. "Better than butter: Margarine and simulation." - in Clarke, David B., Marcus A. Doel, William Merrin, and Richard G. Smith (editors). Jean Baudrillard: Fatal Theories. Routledge, 2009. , 9781134040711. Available on Google Books.

Notes

External links
 Official website 

Swiss cuisine
Bossi, Betty
Bossi, Betty
Bossi, Betty
Bossy, Betty
Companies based in Zürich
Book publishing companies of Switzerland
Swiss cookbooks
Fictional Swiss people